The 2017 Albuquerque mayoral election was a nonpartisan election, held on October 3 and November 14 2017, to choose the next mayor of Albuquerque, New Mexico. Richard J. Berry, the incumbent mayor, did not seek reelection. This was the first mayoral election in Albuquerque without an incumbent candidate in twenty years. All candidates ran on the same ballot. No candidate reached 50% of the vote in the initial round held on October 3, and so a runoff election was held November 14 between the top two finishers.

The race was non-partisan (i.e., party affiliations do not appear on the ballot). However, "although the election is nonpartisan, a candidate’s political affiliation obviously can play a role in the campaign." In order to appear on the ballot, a candidate must collect 3,000 signatures from Albuquerque registered voters and submit them to the city clerk's office.

The maximum allowed campaign contribution that may be given to a candidate is $5,193 per person or company, which is 5% of the mayor's salary.

Alongside the mayoral election, five seats of the city council were up for re-election. Incumbent councillors Ken Sanchez (District 1), Klarissa Peña (District 3), Diane G. Gibson (District 7) and Don Harris (District 9) were re-elected. In the 5th district, Cynthia Borrego, who ran as a Democrat, won the runoff against Robert Aragon, who ran as a Republican for state auditor in 2014. The 5th district seat was vacated by Dan Lewis, who ran for mayor.

Primary election

Candidates

Declared 
 Ricardo Chaves (Republican), founder of Parking Company of America
 Brian Colón (Democratic), former chairman of the Democratic Party of New Mexico
 Michelle Garcia Holmes (Independent), former chief of staff for the Attorney General's Office, retired Albuquerque police detective
 Wayne Johnson (Republican), Bernalillo County Commissioner
 Tim Keller (Democratic), State Auditor
 Dan Lewis (Republican), City Councilor
 Augustus "Gus" Pedrotty (Democratic), University of New Mexico undergraduate student
 Susan Wheeler-Deichsel (Independent), co-founder of civic group Urban ABQ

Did not qualify 
 Eddy Aragon (Independent), conservative talk radio show host on KIVA 95.9 FM
 Lamont Davis
 Rachel Golden, movie theater worker
 Stella Anne Padilla (Democratic), retired Old Town resident

Withdrew 
 Deanna Archuleta (Democratic), former Bernalillo County Commissioner and Deputy Assistant Secretary for Water and Science in the Department of the Interior
 Elan Colello (Democratic), CEO of a virtual reality company
 Scott Madison (Democratic), Kirtland Air Force Base/Sandia National Laboratories nuclear weapons program worker 
 Ian Page
 Jacob Shull

Declined 
 Richard J. Berry (Republican), incumbent mayor
 Pete Dinelli (Democratic), former city councilor and local prosecutor, unsuccessful candidate for mayor in 2013 and 1989 
 James Lewis (Democratic), president of the Alumni Association of the University of New Mexico, former state treasurer

Results

Runoff election

Candidates 
 Tim Keller, State Auditor
 Dan Lewis, City Councilor

Polling

Results

References

2017
2017 New Mexico elections
Albuquerque